Swine Fever (2005) is an original novel written by Andrew Cartmel and based on the long-running British science fiction comic strip Judge Dredd.

Synopsis
Genetic modification has given pigs enhanced intelligence. But somebody is still killing them for their bacon and Judge Dredd must find out who.

External links
 Review at 2000adreview

Judge Dredd novels
Novels by Andrew Cartmel